Arkansas Highway 314 (AR 314 and Hwy. 314) is an east–west state highway in Perry and Yell Counties. The route runs  as a connector between Arkansas Highway 27 and Arkansas Highway 7 in the Ouachita National Forest. The route does not intersect any other state highways.

Route description
Arkansas Highway 314 begins at Arkansas Highway 27 at Onyx, an unincorporated community within the Ouachita National Forest. The route runs east into Perry County to terminate at AR 7 at Hollis near the South Fourche Campground.

The road is a winding, two–lane road surrounded by trees for its entire length. AR 314 follows the South Fork of the Fourche River. There is a county road which breaks from AR 314 and leads to Shed Cemetery.

History
The forest road has existed since Arkansas' earliest records, but the route didn't become a state highway until 1964. The first portion of the route was paved in 1973, but the entire route wasn't complete until 1976.

Major intersections

See also

 List of state highways in Arkansas

References

External links

314
Transportation in Perry County, Arkansas
Transportation in Yell County, Arkansas